Deafness Research UK (The Hearing Research Trust) was the leading national British medical research charity working in the field of deafness. Its main activities are medical research and education.

It was founded as Defeating Deafness in 1985 by the late British Member of Parliament Jack Ashley and his wife Pauline.

It became part of the charity Action on Hearing Loss in 2013.

References

External links
 Official website
 
 

Deaf culture in the United Kingdom
Deafness charities
Deafness organizations
Health charities in the United Kingdom
Health in the London Borough of Camden
Organisations based in the London Borough of Camden
Organizations established in 1985
Research in the United Kingdom
1985 establishments in the United Kingdom